The Borno Central Senatorial District in Borno State, Nigeria covers the local government areas of Bama, Dikwa, Jere, Kaga, Kala/Balge, Konduga, Mafa, Maiduguri, and Ngala. The senator currently representing the district is Kashim Shettima, the current vice president-elect of Nigeria, he was elected in 2019 under the platform of the All Progressives Congress, receiving 80.9% of the votes.

List of Senators

References 

Politics of Borno State
Senatorial districts in Nigeria
Members of the Senate (Nigeria)